Anatoliy Volodymyrovych Trubin (born 1 August 2001) is a Ukrainian professional footballer who plays as a goalkeeper for Ukrainian Premier League club Shakhtar Donetsk and the Ukraine national team.

Club career
Trubin started playing football at Azovstal-2 Mariupol, and joined the academy of Shakhtar Donetsk in 2014. He made his professional debut in a 4–0 league win against Mariupol on 26 May 2019.

International career
He made his debut for Ukraine national team on 31 March 2021 in a World Cup qualifier against Kazakhstan.

Career statistics

Club

International

Honours
Shakhtar Donetsk
Ukrainian Premier League: 2018–19, 2019–20
Ukrainian Cup: 2018–19
Individual
UEFA Champions League Breakthrough XI: 2020
IFFHS Men's Youth (U20) World Team: 2021

References

External links
 

2001 births
Living people
Footballers from Donetsk
Association football goalkeepers
Ukrainian footballers
Ukraine youth international footballers
Ukraine under-21 international footballers
Ukraine international footballers
FC Shakhtar Donetsk players
Ukrainian Premier League players
UEFA Euro 2020 players